This was the first edition of the event.

Venus Williams won the title, defeating Karolína Plíšková in the final 7–5, 7–6(8–6). This resulted in Williams' return to the top 10 rankings for the first time since April 2011.

With the title, Williams became the first woman to win both the WTA Elite Trophy as well as the WTA Finals, which she had won back in 2008.

Players

Alternates

Draw

Finals

Group A

Group B

Group C

Group D

References

External links
 Order of Play
 Single Draw

WTA Elite Trophy
Elite Trophy
2015 in Chinese tennis